The Headsman (aka Shadow of the Sword, Au. Henker) is a 2005 film directed by Simon Aeby. Set in early 16th century Tyrol, it is set before the background of the turmoils of the Lutheran Reformation. It was filmed in Austria and Hungary.

Plot
The Headsman tells a story of loyalty tested by two friends during Europe's 16th-century Inquisition. Orphans Martin (Nikolaj Coster-Waldau) and Georg (Peter McDonald) bond as children, but walk very different paths as adults. Georg follows his calling to join the church, while Martin becomes an army captain. When fate places Martin in the role of executioner, he must choose between friendship and fundamentalist doctrine.

Cast
Nikolaj Coster-Waldau as Martin
Peter McDonald as Georg
Anastasia Griffith as Anna
Steven Berkoff as Inquisitor	
Eddie Marsan as Fabio
Julie Cox as Margaretha	
John Shrapnel as Archbishop
Lee Ingleby as Bernhard
Patrick Godfrey as Bertram
Joe Mason as Jakob

Awards
Montréal World Film Festival - 2005
Nominated for the Grand Prix des Amériques award.

References

External links

2005 films
2005 drama films
Fiction set in the 1540s
Films set in the 16th century
Films set in the Holy Roman Empire
Films shot in Austria
Films shot in Hungary
British drama films
2000s English-language films
2000s British films